was a Japanese jazz pianist.

Life and career
Karashima began playing the piano at the age of three. His father was a music teacher at Kyushu University; Karashima attended the same university. He stayed in New York in 1973, but returned to Japan the next year. In 1975 he joined drummer George Ohtsuka's band. In 1980 he joined Elvin Jones' Jazz Machine, and stayed for five years, including for tours of Europe and the United States. He then switched to being principally a solo pianist, but also led a quintet from 1988 to 1991. During the 1990s he frequently toured internationally. He died of cancer on 24 February 2017.

Discography
An asterisk (*) after the year indicates that it is the year of release.

As leader/co-leader

References

External links
 Official Homepage
 
 

1948 births
2017 deaths
Japanese jazz pianists
Kyushu University alumni